Tom Olstad (born 13 April 1953 in Gjøvik, Norway) is a Norwegian jazz drummer who has performed on many recordings.

Career 
Olstad has lived in Oslo since 1973, when he started his musical studies at Østlandets Musikkonservatorium and University of Oslo, with a graduate thesis on the Jazz Life in Oslo at the 1980's (1992). In Oslo, he joined different jazz orchestras led by Harald Gundhus, Alf Kjellman/Ola Calmeyer, Guttorm Guttormsen, Vidar Johansen/Åsmund Snortheim, Erik Andresen, Atle Hammer, Carl Magnus Neumann, Odd Riisnæs, Christian Reim, Karin Krog, Vidar Johansen Trio including with Kåre Garnes, 1990–, Laila Dalseth/Totti Bergh Quartet, Brinck Johnsen, Merethe Mikkelsen, Sverre Kjelsberg, Magni Wentzel, Kjell Karlsen and Paul Weeden.

Olstad has collaborated in bands like Støff, Søyr, Python, Ab und Zu, Winds Hot & Cool and Radiostorbandet. He has also performed played with United States musicians such as Art van Damme, Art Farmer/Kenny Drew, Benny Bailey, James Moody, Eddie Harris. His first solo album was Changes for Mingus (2007) comprising original compositions inspired by the work of bassist Charles Mingus.

Discography

Solo albums 
2007: Changes For Mingus (Ponca Jazz)

Collaborations 
Trio with Ivar Antonsen & Stig Hvalryg
2011: A Day at the Opera (Ponca Jazz)

References

External links 
Olstad:Changes For Mingus

1953 births
Living people
20th-century Norwegian drummers
21st-century Norwegian drummers
Norwegian jazz drummers
Male drummers
Norwegian jazz composers
Ponca Jazz Records artists
Taurus Records artists
Musicians from Gjøvik
20th-century drummers
Male jazz composers
20th-century Norwegian male musicians
21st-century Norwegian male musicians
Søyr members